Double Barrelled Soul is a 1967 album by organist Brother Jack McDuff and saxophonist David Newman which was released on the Atlantic label.

Reception
The Allmusic site awarded the album 3 stars.

Track listing 
All compositions by David Newman except as indicated
 "But It's Alright" (J. J. Jackson, Pierre Tubbs) - 6:00   
 "Sunny" (Bobby Hebb) - 6:30   
 "Esperanto" (Jack McDuff, Billy Meshel) - 4:46   
 "Duffin' 'Round" - 5:05   
 "More Head" - 4:32   
 "Untitled Blues" (McDuff) - 9:21   
Recorded in New York City on August 8, 1967 (track 4) and August 9, 1967 (tracks 1-3, 5 & 6).

Personnel 
Jack McDuff - organ
David Newman, Danny Turner - alto saxophone, tenor saxophone, flute
Leo Johnson - tenor saxophone, flute
Melvin Sparks - guitar
Abe Blassingame - drums

References 

)

Jack McDuff albums
David "Fathead" Newman albums
1967 albums
Atlantic Records albums
Albums produced by Joel Dorn